David Charles "Dave" Ottley (born 5 August 1955 in West Thurrock, Essex) is a retired British athlete who mainly competed in the men's javelin throw event.

Athletics career
Ottley competed for Great Britain at the 1984 Summer Olympics held in Los Angeles, United States where he won the silver medal in the men's javelin throw event.

Ottley represented England, at the 1978 Commonwealth Games in Edmonton, Alberta, Canada and also represented England, at the 1982 Commonwealth Games in Brisbane, Queensland, Australia. He represented England for a third time at the Commonwelath Games and won a gold medal in the javelin event, at the 1986 Commonwealth Games in Edinburgh, Scotland.

He won the AAA National Championship title in the javelin on six occasions.

Personal life
Ottley is referenced In "The Boy Who Cried Rat" episode of Good Morning Miss Bliss, in which Mr. Belding (Dennis Haskins) proclaims that nobody remembers second place, referencing the javelin throw of 1984 Summer Olympics. Miss Bliss however correctly identifies that the silver medallist was indeed Ottley.

Ottley now resides in Shropshire, and has two children.

International competitions

References

 Profile
 

Living people
1955 births
People from West Thurrock
English male javelin throwers
Olympic athletes of Great Britain
Olympic silver medallists for Great Britain
Athletes (track and field) at the 1980 Summer Olympics
Athletes (track and field) at the 1984 Summer Olympics
Athletes (track and field) at the 1988 Summer Olympics
Commonwealth Games gold medallists for England
Commonwealth Games medallists in athletics
Athletes (track and field) at the 1978 Commonwealth Games
Athletes (track and field) at the 1982 Commonwealth Games
Athletes (track and field) at the 1986 Commonwealth Games
World Athletics Championships athletes for Great Britain
Medalists at the 1984 Summer Olympics
Olympic silver medalists in athletics (track and field)
Universiade medalists in athletics (track and field)
Universiade silver medalists for Great Britain
Medalists at the 1977 Summer Universiade
Medallists at the 1986 Commonwealth Games